Sadoon Abboud (born 2 July 1967) is an Iraqi boxer. He competed in the 1988 Summer Olympics in the featherweight division. In his first round, he beat Laotian boxer Bounmy Thephavong. In his second round, he lost to Róbert Isaszegi of Hungary.

References

1967 births
Living people
Boxers at the 1988 Summer Olympics
Iraqi male boxers
Olympic boxers of Iraq
Featherweight boxers